The 1972 Japan Series was the 23rd edition of Nippon Professional Baseball's postseason championship series. It matched the Central League champion Yomiuri Giants against the Pacific League champion Hankyu Braves. This was the fifth time in the last six years that the two teams had met in the Japan Series, with the Giants having won all previous matchups. The Giants defeated the Braves in five games to win their eighth consecutive title.

Summary

See also
1972 World Series

References

Japan Series
Orix Buffaloes
Yomiuri Giants
Japan Series
Japan Series
Japan Series